The Harbin–Suifenhe railway, named the Binsui Railway, is a double-track electrified trunk railway in Northeast China between Harbin and Suifenhe on the Russian border. The line was originally built by Russia as the eastern branch of the Chinese Eastern Railway, which linked Chita with Vladivostok.  Today, the  railway is administered by Harbin Railway Bureau.

History
Initial construction of the Binsui Railway as a Russian gauge line of the Sino-Russian Chinese Eastern Railway started on 9 June 1898 at the two termini of the line, Harbin in China and Ussuriysk in Russia. The partially built line was destroyed during the Boxer Rebellion between March and July 1900, causing the project to be suspended. Construction resumed in October, and on 14 November 1901 operation on a temporary basis was started. Official opening of the line took place on 14 July 1903.

After the creation of the Japanese puppet state of Manchukuo in 1932, the CER became a Soviet-Manchukuo joint enterprise, and was renamed the "North Manchuria Railway". In March 1935, the government of Manchukuo purchased the Soviet share of the NMR, and merged it into the Manchukuo National Railway, and on 17 June 1936, work to convert the line, known during that time as the Binsui Line (Hinsui Line in Japanese), from Russian broad gauge to standard gauge was completed. The MNR double tracked the line as far as Yimianpo in 1939, and relaid the line with heavier rail in 1942.

The MNR began construction of the original Ducao Tunnel in July 1937, opening the new, shorter line on 31 July 1942. At , it was China's longest railway tunnel. To expand the capacity of the line, China Railway decided to build a second tunnel,  in length, in 1961, but construction was suspended a year later. Work resumed on 1 May 1975, and was completed by the end of 1978. Refurbishment of the original tunnel began in September 1985 and was completed on 21 December 1988.

After the Soviet invasion of Manchuria in 1945, the Soviet Army converted the line back to Russian broad gauge. In 1946, it was converted back to standard gauge once again, and the double tracking was removed; the rails taken up were used to repair other lines. Between 1945 and 1955, the railways in the territory of the former Manchukuo were controlled by the Sino-Soviet China Changchun Railway, after which the railways of the region were taken over by China Railways; the Binsui Line then reverted to its original name, Binsui Railway. The double tracking of the section from Harbin to Mudanjiang was rebuilt by China Railways in 1958. Electrification of the line began in 2010, and the first section, from Mudanjiang to Suifenhe, was completed on 28 December 2015. Wiring of the Harbin–Mudanjiang section began in April 2016. Passenger traffic on the line has increased to 2.3 million passengers annually.

Route

References

Railway lines in China
Rail transport in Heilongjiang
Railway lines opened in 1901